Case-ready meat, retail-ready meat, or pre-packaged meat refers to fresh meat that is processed and packaged at a central facility and delivered to the store ready to be put directly into the meat case.

Background
Traditionally, most meat was shipped as primal cuts from the slaughterhouse to the butcher.  Meat was then cut to commonly used cuts and packaged at the store or was custom cut for consumers.

Case-ready meat is cut and packaged at central regional facilities and sent to retail stores ready for placement in refrigerated display cases.  Local butchering, cutting, trimming, and overwrapping the meat at retail stores is greatly reduced. 

Advantages of the centralized master-packager preparation include: efficiency of centralized operations, tight quality control, close control of sanitization, specialized packaging, etc.

Packaging

Centralized cutting  and processing of meats has the potential of  reducing the shelf life of the cuts.  Specialized packaging is needed to regain and even extend that shelf life.  

Packaging includes tray, absorbent pad, specialty plastic films, etc. 
Oxygen scavengers and modified atmosphere packaging are used to keep the products visually appealing and consumer safe.

Distribution
Control of temperature during the distribution cold chain is critical to meat quality and safety.

See also
 Food industry
 Food science
Vacuum packaging
Skin pack

References

Further reading
 Robertson, G. L. (2013). "Food Packaging: Principles & Practice". CRC Press. 
 Yam, K. L., "Encyclopedia of Packaging Technology", John Wiley & Sons, 2009, 

Meat
Packaging
Retail packaging